Teeyan is the regional name of the festival of Teej which is celebrated throughout Punjab which is dedicated to the onset of the monsoon and focuses on daughters and sisters.

Celebration
The festival is celebrated during the monsoon season from the third day of the lunar month of Sawan on the bright half, up to the full moon of sawan(about 13 days), by women. Married women go to their maternal house to participate in the festivities. In the past, it was traditional for women to spend the whole month of Sawan with their parents.

Gifts
Whether or not a married woman goes to her parents, brothers take a gift set to their sisters called a 'sandhara'. A sandhara includes a Punjabi Suit/sari, laddoo, bangles, mehndi (henna) and a swing.

Gidha and swings

The festival of teeyan centres on girls and women getting together in the village green and tying swings to the trees. The festival gathers momentum in the teeyan Gidha.

Traditional bolyan which are sung to dance Gidha include:

Punjabi:
ਓੁੱਚੇ ਟਾਹਣੇ ਪੀਂਘ ਪਾ ਦੇ
ਜਿਥੇ ਆਪ ਹੁਲਾਰਾ ਆਵੇ

Uchay tahne peeng pa de
jithey aap hulara aavey

Translation
Hang my swing from a high tree branch 
where the swing moves by itself 

The main focus of the teeyan is dancing Giddha. In the past, the festival would last for as long as the girls wishes ranging from a few days to four weeks. Girls would gather to dance Giddha every day. The festival would close by the women performing the closing dance called 'bhallho'. Bhallo or ballo is performed by the women standing in two rows and dancing. This tradition of women getting together in villages has now become extinct.

Food
The food traditionally associated with teeyan is:
 kheer (rice boiled in milk)
 poorhay (fried bread)
 halwa
 malpua (spelled malpura)
 Gulgullay which are made from jaggery syrup mixed with wheat flour and then made into balls, and then fried
 Mandey are made of wheat floor but the dough is thin. The flat mandey bread is not rolled out using a rolling pin but stretched with the hands and then placed on the back of both hands before being put on the griddle to bake.

Observance
Punjabis consider teeyan as a seasonal festival. Although the teeyan gatherings are not as common in the villages in Punjab, the festival is observed on a low-key scale, especially in schools and colleges.
Government sponsored teeyan festivals are observed at pre-selected sites. Festivals are held in Surrey, and Brampton in  Canada and in other countries outside of India such as in Southall and Smethwick in the United Kingdom. Festivals are also organised in Melbourne Australia. and in Singapore.

References

Festivals in India
Punjabi festivals